Hans Faye Holst (10 February 1788 – 14 August 1843) was a Norwegian politician.

He was elected to the Norwegian Parliament in 1830, representing the constituency of Drammen. He worked as a merchant and consul in that city. He sat through only one term.

References

1788 births
1843 deaths
Norwegian merchants
Members of the Storting
Buskerud politicians
Politicians from Drammen
19th-century Norwegian businesspeople